The 71st United States Congress was a meeting of the legislature of the United States federal government, consisting of the United States Senate and the United States House of Representatives. It met in Washington, D.C. from March 4, 1929, to March 4, 1931, during the first two years of Herbert Hoover's presidency. The apportionment of seats in the House of Representatives was based on the 1910 United States census.

Both the House and Senate remained under Republican control, with increased majorities in each chamber. And with Herbert Hoover being sworn in as president on March 4, 1929, the Republicans maintained an overall federal government trifecta.

The 71st Congress also featured the most special elections of any Congress with 27 in all.

Major events

 March 4, 1929: Herbert C. Hoover became President of the United States
 October 24, 1929 – October 29, 1929: Wall Street Crash of 1929: Three multi-digit percentage drops wipe out more than $30 billion from the New York Stock Exchange (3 times greater than the annual budget of the federal government).
 October 25, 1929: Former U.S. Interior Secretary Albert B. Fall is convicted of bribery for his role in the Teapot Dome scandal, becoming the first Presidential cabinet member to go to prison for actions in office.

Major legislation

 June 15, 1929: Agriculture Marketing Act, ch. 24, 
 June 18, 1929: Reapportionment Act of 1929, ch. 28, 
 May 14, 1930: Federal Bureau of Prisons Act, ch. 274, 
 June 17, 1930: Hawley-Smoot Tariff Act, ch. 497, (including: Title III, Plant Patent Act)
 July 3, 1930: Veterans Administration Act, ch. 863, 
 March 3, 1931: Davis–Bacon Act, ch. 411, 
 March 3, 1931: An Act To make The Star-Spangled Banner the national anthem of the United States of America, ch. 436,

Party summary
The count below identifies party affiliations at the beginning of the first session of this Congress, and includes members from vacancies and newly admitted states, when they were first seated. Changes resulting from subsequent replacements are shown below in the "Changes in membership" section.

Senate

House of Representatives

Leadership

Senate 

 President: Charles Curtis (R)
 President pro tempore: George H. Moses (R)
 Majority leader: James E. Watson (R)
 Minority leader: Joseph T. Robinson (D)
 Majority whip: Simeon D. Fess (R)
 Minority whip: Morris Sheppard (D)
 Republican Conference Secretary:  Frederick Hale 
 Democratic Caucus Secretary: Hugo Black

House of Representatives 
 Speaker: Nicholas Longworth (R)
 Majority leader: John Q. Tilson (R)
 Minority leader: John N. Garner (D)
 Majority Whip: Albert Henry Vestal (R)
 Minority Whip: John McDuffie (D)
 Republican Conference Chair: Willis C. Hawley
 Democratic Caucus Chairman: David Hayes Kincheloe
 Democratic Campaign Committee Chairman: Joseph W. Byrns Sr.
 Republican Campaign Committee Chairman: William R. Wood

Members
This list is arranged by chamber, then by state. Senators are listed in order of seniority, and representatives are listed by district.

Senate
Senators were elected every two years, with one-third beginning new six-year terms with each Congress. Preceding the names in the list below are Senate class numbers, which indicate the cycle of their election. In this Congress, Class 1 meant their term began in this Congress, requiring reelection in 1934; Class 2 meant their term ended with this Congress, requiring reelection in 1930; and Class 3 meant their term began in the last Congress, requiring reelection in 1932.

Alabama 
 2. James Thomas Heflin (D)
 3. Hugo Black (D)

Arizona 
 1. Henry F. Ashurst (D)
 3. Carl Hayden (D)

Arkansas 
 2. Joseph Taylor Robinson (D)
 3. Thaddeus H. Caraway (D)

California 
 1. Hiram Johnson (R)
 3. Samuel M. Shortridge (R)

Colorado 
 2. Lawrence C. Phipps (R)
 3. Charles W. Waterman (R)

Connecticut 
 1. Frederic C. Walcott (R)
 3. Hiram Bingham III (R)

Delaware 
 1. John G. Townsend Jr. (R)
 2. Daniel O. Hastings (R)

Florida 
 1. Park Trammell (D)
 3. Duncan U. Fletcher (D)

Georgia 
 2. William J. Harris (D)
 3. Walter F. George (D)

Idaho 
 2. William Borah (R)
 3. John W. Thomas (R)

Illinois 
 2. Charles S. Deneen (R)
 3. Otis F. Glenn (R)

Indiana 
 1. Arthur Raymond Robinson (R)
 3. James Eli Watson (R)

Iowa 
 2. Daniel F. Steck (D)
 3. Smith W. Brookhart (R)

Kansas 
 2. Arthur Capper (R)
 3. Henry Justin Allen (R), April 1, 1929 – November 30, 1930
 George McGill (D), from December 1, 1930

Kentucky 
 2. Frederic M. Sackett (R), until January 9, 1930
 John M. Robsion (R), January 11, 1930 – November 30, 1930
 Ben M. Williamson (D), from December 1, 1930
 3. Alben W. Barkley (D)

Louisiana 
 2. Joseph E. Ransdell (D)
 3. Edwin S. Broussard (D)

Maine 
 1. Frederick Hale (R)
 2. Arthur R. Gould (R)

Maryland 
 1. Phillips Lee Goldsborough (R)
 3. Millard Tydings (D)

Massachusetts 
 1. David I. Walsh (D)
 2. Frederick H. Gillett (R)

Michigan 
 1. Arthur H. Vandenberg (R)
 2. James J. Couzens (R)

Minnesota 
 1. Henrik Shipstead (FL)
 2. Thomas D. Schall (R)

Mississippi 
 1. Hubert D. Stephens (D)
 2. Pat Harrison (D)

Missouri 
 1. Roscoe C. Patterson (R)
 3. Harry B. Hawes (D)

Montana 
 1. Burton K. Wheeler (D)
 2. Thomas J. Walsh (D)

Nebraska 
 1. Robert B. Howell (R)
 2. George W. Norris (R)

Nevada 
 1. Key Pittman (D)
 3. Tasker Oddie (R)

New Hampshire 
 2. Henry W. Keyes (R)
 3. George H. Moses (R)

New Jersey 
 1. Hamilton Fish Kean (R)
 2. Walter Evans Edge (R), until November 21, 1929
 David Baird Jr. (R), November 30, 1929 – December 2, 1930
 Dwight Morrow (R), from December 3, 1930

New Mexico 
 1. Bronson M. Cutting (R)
 2. Sam G. Bratton (D)

New York 
 1. Royal S. Copeland (D)
 3. Robert F. Wagner (D)

North Carolina 
 2. Furnifold McLendel Simmons (D)
 3. Lee Slater Overman (D), until December 12, 1930 
 Cameron A. Morrison (D), from December 13, 1930

North Dakota 
 1. Lynn Frazier (R-NPL)
 3. Gerald Nye (R)

Ohio 
 1. Simeon D. Fess (R)
 3. Theodore E. Burton (R), until October 28, 1929
 Roscoe C. McCulloch (R), November 5, 1929 – November 30, 1930
 Robert J. Bulkley (D), from December 1, 1930

Oklahoma 
 2. William B. Pine (R)
 3. Elmer Thomas (D)

Oregon 
 2. Charles L. McNary (R)
 3. Frederick Steiwer (R)

Pennsylvania 
 1. David A. Reed (R)
 3. Vacant until December 9, 1929
 Joseph R. Grundy (R), December 11, 1929 – December 1, 1930
 James J. Davis (R), from December 2, 1930

Rhode Island 
 1. Felix Hebert (R)
 2. Jesse H. Metcalf (R)

South Carolina 
 2. Coleman Livingston Blease (D)
 3. Ellison D. Smith (D)

South Dakota 
 2. William H. McMaster (R)
 3. Peter Norbeck (R)

Tennessee 
 1. Kenneth McKellar (D)
 2. Lawrence Tyson (D), until August 24, 1929
 William Emerson Brock (D), from September 2, 1929

Texas 
 1. Tom Connally (D)
 2. Morris Sheppard (D)

Utah 
 1. William H. King (D)
 3. Reed Smoot (R)

Vermont 
 1. Frank L. Greene (R), until December 17, 1930
 Frank C. Partridge (R), from December 23, 1930
 3. Porter H. Dale (R)

Virginia 
 1. Claude A. Swanson (D)
 2. Carter Glass (D)

Washington 
 1. Clarence Dill (D)
 3. Wesley Livsey Jones (R)

West Virginia 
 1. Henry D. Hatfield (R)
 2. Guy D. Goff (R)

Wisconsin 
 1. Robert M. La Follette Jr. (R)
 3. John J. Blaine (R)

Wyoming 
 1. John B. Kendrick (D)
 2. Francis E. Warren (R), until November 24, 1929
 Patrick Joseph Sullivan (R), December 5, 1929 – November 20, 1930
 Robert D. Carey (R), from December 1, 1930

House of Representatives
The names of members of the House of Representatives are preceded by their districts.

Alabama 
 . John McDuffie (D)
 . J. Lister Hill (D)
 . Henry B. Steagall (D)
 . Lamar Jeffers (D)
 . LaFayette L. Patterson (D)
 . William B. Oliver (D)
 . Miles C. Allgood (D)
 . Edward B. Almon (D)
 . George Huddleston (D)
 . William B. Bankhead (D)

Arizona 
 . Lewis W. Douglas (D)

Arkansas 
 . William J. Driver (D)
 . Pearl Peden Oldfield (D)
 . Claude A. Fuller (D)
 . Otis Wingo (D), until October 21, 1930
 Effiegene L. Wingo (D), from November 4, 1930
 . Heartsill Ragon (D)
 . David D. Glover (D)
 . Tilman B. Parks (D)

California 
 . Clarence F. Lea (D)
 . Harry L. Englebright (R)
 . Charles F. Curry (R), until October 10, 1930
 . Florence P. Kahn (R)
 . Richard J. Welch (R)
 . Albert E. Carter (R)
 . Henry E. Barbour (R)
 . Arthur M. Free (R)
 . William E. Evans (R)
 . Joe Crail (R)
 . Philip D. Swing (R)

Colorado 
 . William R. Eaton (R)
 . Charles B. Timberlake (R)
 . Guy U. Hardy (R)
 . Edward T. Taylor (D)

Connecticut 
 . E. Hart Fenn (R)
 . Richard P. Freeman (R)
 . John Q. Tilson (R)
 . Schuyler Merritt (R)
 . James P. Glynn (R), until March 6, 1930
 Edward W. Goss (R), from November 4, 1930

Delaware 
 . Robert G. Houston (R)

Florida 
 . Herbert J. Drane (D)
 . Robert A. Green (D)
 . Thomas A. Yon (D)
 . Ruth Bryan Owen (D)

Georgia 
 . Charles G. Edwards (D)
 . Edward E. Cox (D)
 . Charles R. Crisp (D)
 . William C. Wright (D)
 . Leslie J. Steele (D), until July 24, 1929
 Robert C. W. Ramspeck (D), from October 2, 1929
 . Samuel Rutherford (D)
 . Malcolm C. Tarver (D)
 . Charles H. Brand (D)
 . Thomas M. Bell (D)
 . Carl Vinson (D)
 . William C. Lankford (D)
 . William W. Larsen (D)

Idaho 
 . Burton L. French (R)
 . Addison T. Smith (R)

Illinois 
 . Ruth Hanna McCormick (R)
 . Richard Yates (R)
 . Oscar S. De Priest (R)
 . Morton D. Hull (R)
 . Elliott W. Sproul (R)
 . Thomas A. Doyle (D)
 . Adolph J. Sabath (D)
 . James T. Igoe (D)
 . M. Alfred Michaelson (R)
 . Stanley H. Kunz (D)
 . Frederick A. Britten (R)
 . Carl R. Chindblom (R)
 . Frank R. Reid (R)
 . John T. Buckbee (R)
 . William R. Johnson (R)
 . John C. Allen (R)
 . Burnett M. Chiperfield (R), from November 4, 1930
 . William E. Hull (R)
 . Homer W. Hall (R)
 . William P. Holaday (R)
 . Charles Adkins (R)
 . Henry T. Rainey (D)
 . Frank M. Ramey (R)
 . Edward M. Irwin (R)
 . William W. Arnold (D)
 . Thomas S. Williams (R), until November 11, 1929
 Claude V. Parsons (D), from November 4, 1930
 . Edward E. Denison (R)

Indiana 
 . Harry E. Rowbottom (R)
 . Arthur H. Greenwood (D)
 . James W. Dunbar (R)
 . Harry C. Canfield (D)
 . Noble J. Johnson (R)
 . Richard N. Elliott (R)
 . Louis L. Ludlow (D)
 . Albert H. Vestal (R)
 . Fred S. Purnell (R)
 . William R. Wood (R)
 . Albert R. Hall (R)
 . David Hogg (R)
 . Andrew J. Hickey (R)

Iowa 
 . William F. Kopp (R)
 . F. Dickinson Letts (R)
 . Thomas J. B. Robinson (R)
 . Gilbert N. Haugen (R)
 . Cyrenus Cole (R)
 . C. William Ramseyer (R)
 . Cassius C. Dowell (R)
 . Lloyd Thurston (R)
 . Charles E. Swanson (R)
 . Lester J. Dickinson (R)
 . Ed H. Campbell (R)

Kansas 
 . William P. Lambertson (R)
 . Ulysses S. Guyer (R)
 . William H. Sproul (R)
 . Homer Hoch (R)
 . James G. Strong (R)
 . Charles I. Sparks (R)
 . Clifford R. Hope (R)
 . William A. Ayres (D)

Kentucky 
 . William V. Gregory (D)
 . David H. Kincheloe (D), until October 5, 1930
 John L. Dorsey Jr. (D), from November 4, 1930
 . Charles W. Roark (R), until April 5, 1929
 John W. Moore (D), from June 1, 1929
 . John D. Craddock (R)
 . Maurice H. Thatcher (R)
 . J. Lincoln Newhall (R)
 . Robert E. L. Blackburn (R)
 . Lewis L. Walker (R)
 . Elva R. Kendall (R)
 . Katherine G. Langley (R)
 . John M. Robsion (R), until January 10, 1930
 Charles Finley (R), from February 15, 1930

Louisiana 
 . James O'Connor (D)
 . J. Zach Spearing (D)
 . Whitmell P. Martin (D), until April 6, 1929
 Numa F. Montet (D), from August 6, 1929
 . John N. Sandlin (D)
 . Riley J. Wilson (D)
 . Bolivar E. Kemp (D)
 . René L. De Rouen (D)
 . James B. Aswell (D)

Maine 
 . Carroll L. Beedy (R)
 . Wallace H. White Jr. (R)
 . John E. Nelson (R)
 . Donald F. Snow (R)

Maryland 
 . T. Alan Goldsborough (D)
 . Linwood L. Clark (R)
 . Vincent L. Palmisano (D)
 . J. Charles Linthicum (D)
 . Stephen W. Gambrill (D)
 . Frederick N. Zihlman (R)

Massachusetts 
 . Allen T. Treadway (R)
 . William Kirk Kaynor (R), until December 20, 1929
 William J. Granfield (D), from February 11, 1930
 . Frank H. Foss (R)
 . George R. Stobbs (R)
 . Edith Nourse Rogers (R)
 . A. Piatt Andrew Jr. (R)
 . William P. Connery Jr. (D)
 . Frederick W. Dallinger (R)
 . Charles L. Underhill (R)
 . John J. Douglass (D)
 . George Holden Tinkham (R)
 . John W. McCormack (D)
 . Robert Luce (R)
 . Richard B. Wigglesworth (R)
 . Joseph W. Martin Jr. (R)
 . Charles L. Gifford (R)

Michigan 
 . Robert H. Clancy (R)
 . Earl C. Michener (R)
 . Joseph L. Hooper (R)
 . John C. Ketcham (R)
 . Carl E. Mapes (R)
 . Grant M. Hudson (R)
 . Louis C. Cramton (R)
 . Bird J. Vincent (R)
 . James C. McLaughlin (R)
 . Roy O. Woodruff (R)
 . Frank P. Bohn (R)
 . W. Frank James (R)
 . Clarence J. McLeod (R)

Minnesota 
 . Victor L. A. Christgau (R)
 . Frank Clague (R)
 . August H. Andresen (R)
 . Melvin J. Maas (R)
 . Walter H. Newton (R), until June 30, 1929
 William I. Nolan (R), from July 17, 1929
 . Harold Knutson (R)
 . Ole J. Kvale (FL), until September 11, 1929
 Paul J. Kvale (FL), from October 16, 1929
 . William A. Pittenger (R)
 . Conrad G. Selvig (R)
 . Godfrey G. Goodwin (R)

Mississippi 
 . John E. Rankin (D)
 . Wall Doxey (D)
 . William M. Whittington (D)
 . T. Jefferson Busby (D)
 . Ross A. Collins (D)
 . Robert S. Hall (D)
 . Percy E. Quin (D)
 . James W. Collier (D)

Missouri 
 . Milton A. Romjue (D)
 . Ralph F. Lozier (D)
 . Jacob L. Milligan (D)
 . David W. Hopkins (R)
 . Edgar C. Ellis (R)
 . Thomas J. Halsey (R)
 . John W. Palmer (R)
 . William L. Nelson (D)
 . Clarence A. Cannon (D)
 . Henry F. Niedringhaus (R)
 . John J. Cochran (D)
 . Leonidas C. Dyer (R)
 . Charles E. Kiefner (R)
 . Dewey J. Short (R)
 . Joe J. Manlove (R)
 . Rowland L. Johnston (R)

Montana 
 . John M. Evans (D)
 . Scott Leavitt (R)

Nebraska 
 . John H. Morehead (D)
 . Willis G. Sears (R)
 . Edgar Howard (D)
 . Charles H. Sloan (R)
 . Fred G. Johnson (R)
 . Robert G. Simmons (R)

Nevada 
 . Samuel S. Arentz (R)

New Hampshire 
 . Fletcher Hale (R)
 . Edward H. Wason (R)

New Jersey 
 . Charles A. Wolverton (R)
 . Isaac Bacharach (R)
 . Harold G. Hoffman (R)
 . Charles A. Eaton (R)
 . Ernest R. Ackerman (R)
 . Randolph Perkins (R)
 . George N. Seger (R)
 . Fred A. Hartley Jr. (R)
 . Franklin W. Fort (R)
 . Frederick R. Lehlbach (R)
 . Oscar L. Auf der Heide (D)
 . Mary T. Norton (D)

New Mexico 
 . Albert Gallatin Simms (R)

New York 
 . Robert L. Bacon (R)
 . William F. Brunner (D)
 . George W. Lindsay (D)
 . Thomas H. Cullen (D)
 . Loring M. Black Jr. (D)
 . Andrew L. Somers (D)
 . John F. Quayle (D), until November 27, 1930
 . Patrick J. Carley (D)
 . David J. O'Connell (D), until December 29, 1930
 Stephen A. Rudd (D), from February 17, 1931
 . Emanuel Celler (D)
 . Anning S. Prall (D)
 . Samuel Dickstein (D)
 . Christopher D. Sullivan (D)
 . William I. Sirovich (D)
 . John J. Boylan (D)
 . John J. O'Connor (D)
 . Ruth Baker Pratt (R)
 . John F. Carew (D), until December 28, 1929
 Martin J. Kennedy (D), from April 11, 1930
 . Sol Bloom (D)
 . Fiorello H. LaGuardia (R)
 . Joseph A. Gavagan (D), from November 5, 1929
 . Anthony J. Griffin (D)
 . Frank Oliver (D)
 . James M. Fitzpatrick (D)
 . J. Mayhew Wainwright (R)
 . Hamilton Fish III (R)
 . Harcourt J. Pratt (R)
 . Parker Corning (D)
 . James S. Parker (R)
 . Frank Crowther (R)
 . Bertrand H. Snell (R)
 . Francis D. Culkin (R)
 . Frederick M. Davenport (R)
 . John D. Clarke (R)
 . Clarence E. Hancock (R)
 . John Taber (R)
 . Gale H. Stalker (R)
 . James L. Whitley (R)
 . Archie D. Sanders (R)
 . S. Wallace Dempsey (R)
 . Edmund F. Cooke (R)
 . James M. Mead (D)
 . Daniel A. Reed (R)

North Carolina 
 . Lindsay C. Warren (D)
 . John H. Kerr (D)
 . Charles L. Abernethy (D)
 . Edward W. Pou (D)
 . Charles M. Stedman (D), until September 23, 1930
 Franklin W. Hancock Jr. (D), from November 4, 1930
 . J. Bayard Clark (D)
 . William C. Hammer (D), until September 26, 1930
 Hinton James (D), from November 4, 1930
 . Robert L. Doughton (D)
 . Charles A. Jonas (R)
 . George M. Pritchard (R)

North Dakota 
 . Olger B. Burtness (R)
 . Thomas Hall (R)
 . James H. Sinclair (R)

Ohio 
 . Nicholas Longworth (R)
 . William E. Hess (R)
 . Roy G. Fitzgerald (R)
 . John L. Cable (R)
 . Charles J. Thompson (R)
 . Charles C. Kearns (R)
 . Charles Brand (R)
 . Grant E. Mouser Jr. (R)
 . William W. Chalmers (R)
 . Thomas A. Jenkins (R)
 . Mell G. Underwood (D)
 . John C. Speaks (R)
 . Joseph E. Baird (R)
 . Francis Seiberling (R)
 . C. Ellis Moore (R)
 . Charles B. McClintock (R)
 . William M. Morgan (R)
 . B. Frank Murphy (R)
 . John G. Cooper (R)
 . Charles A. Mooney (D)
 . Robert Crosser (D)
 . Chester C. Bolton (R)

Oklahoma 
 . Charles O'Connor (R)
 . William W. Hastings (D)
 . Wilburn Cartwright (D)
 . Thomas D. McKeown (D)
 . Ulysses S. Stone (R)
 . Jed J. Johnson (D)
 . James V. McClintic (D)
 . Milton C. Garber (R)

Oregon 
 . Willis C. Hawley (R)
 . Robert R. Butler (R)
 . Franklin F. Korell (R)

Pennsylvania 
 . James M. Beck (R)
 . George S. Graham (R)
 . Harry C. Ransley (R)
 . Benjamin M. Golder (R)
 . James J. Connolly (R)
 . George A. Welsh (R)
 . George P. Darrow (R)
 . James Wolfenden (R)
 . Henry W. Watson (R)
 . William W. Griest (R), until December 5, 1929
 J. Roland Kinzer (R), from January 28, 1930
 . Laurence H. Watres (R)
 . John J. Casey (D), until May 5, 1929
 C. Murray Turpin (R), from June 4, 1929
 . George F. Brumm (R)
 . Charles J. Esterly (R)
 . Louis T. McFadden (R)
 . Edgar R. Kiess (R), until July 20, 1930
 Robert F. Rich (R), from November 4, 1930
 . Frederick W. Magrady (R)
 . Edward M. Beers (R)
 . Isaac H. Doutrich (R)
 . J. Russell Leech (R)
 . J. Banks Kurtz (R)
 . Franklin Menges (R)
 . J. Mitchell Chase (R)
 . Samuel A. Kendall (R)
 . Henry W. Temple (R)
 . J. Howard Swick (R)
 . Nathan L. Strong (R)
 . Thomas C. Cochran (R)
 . Milton W. Shreve (R)
 . William R. Coyle (R)
 . Adam M. Wyant (R)
 . Stephen G. Porter (R), until June 27, 1930
 Edmund F. Erk (R), from November 4, 1930
 . M. Clyde Kelly (R)
 . Patrick J. Sullivan (R)
 . Harry A. Estep (R)
 . Guy E. Campbell (R)

Rhode Island 
 . Clark Burdick (R)
 . Richard S. Aldrich (R)
 . Jeremiah E. O'Connell (D), until May 9, 1930
 Francis B. Condon (D), from November 4, 1930

South Carolina 
 . Thomas S. McMillan (D)
 . Butler B. Hare (D)
 . Frederick H. Dominick (D)
 . John J. McSwain (D)
 . William F. Stevenson (D)
 . Allard H. Gasque (D)
 . Hampton P. Fulmer (D)

South Dakota 
 . Charles A. Christopherson (R)
 . Royal C. Johnson (R)
 . William Williamson (R)

Tennessee 
 . B. Carroll Reece (R)
 . J. Will Taylor (R)
 . Sam D. McReynolds (D)
 . Cordell Hull (D)
 . Ewin L. Davis (D)
 . Joseph W. Byrns Sr. (D)
 . Edward Everett Eslick (D)
 . Gordon Browning (D)
 . Jere Cooper (D)
 . Hubert Fisher (D)

Texas 
 . Wright Patman (D)
 . John C. Box (D)
 . Morgan G. Sanders (D)
 . Sam Rayburn (D)
 . Hatton W. Sumners (D)
 . Luther Alexander Johnson (D)
 . Clay Stone Briggs (D)
 . Daniel E. Garrett (D)
 . Joseph J. Mansfield (D)
 . James P. Buchanan (D)
 . Oliver H. Cross (D)
 . Fritz G. Lanham (D)
 . Guinn Williams (D)
 . Augustus McCloskey (D), until February 10, 1930
 Harry M. Wurzbach (R), from February 10, 1930
 . John N. Garner (D)
 . Claude B. Hudspeth (D)
 . Robert Q. Lee (D), until April 18, 1930
 Thomas L. Blanton (D), from May 20, 1930
 . J. Marvin Jones (D)

Utah 
 . Don B. Colton (R)
 . Elmer O. Leatherwood (R), until December 24, 1929
 Frederick C. Loofbourow (R), from November 4, 1930

Vermont 
 . Elbert S. Brigham (R)
 . Ernest Willard Gibson (R)

Virginia 
 . S. Otis Bland (D)
 . Menalcus Lankford (R)
 . Andrew J. Montague (D)
 . Patrick H. Drewry (D)
 . Joseph Whitehead (D)
 . Clifton A. Woodrum (D)
 . Jacob A. Garber (R)
 . R. Walton Moore (D)
 . Joseph C. Shaffer (R)
 . Henry St. George Tucker III (D)

Washington 
 . John F. Miller (R)
 . Lindley H. Hadley (R)
 . Albert Johnson (R)
 . John W. Summers (R)
 . Samuel B. Hill (D)

West Virginia 
 . Carl G. Bachmann (R)
 . Frank L. Bowman (R)
 . John M. Wolverton (R)
 . James A. Hughes (R), until March 2, 1930
 Robert L. Hogg (R), from November 4, 1930
 . Hugh Ike Shott (R)
 . Joe L. Smith (D)

Wisconsin 
 . Henry A. Cooper (R), until March 1, 1931
 . Charles A. Kading (R)
 . John M. Nelson (R)
 . John C. Schafer (R)
 . William H. Stafford (R)
 . Florian Lampert (R), until July 18, 1930
 Michael Reilly (D), from November 4, 1930
 . Merlin Hull (R)
 . Edward E. Browne (R)
 . George J. Schneider (R)
 . James A. Frear (R)
 . Hubert H. Peavey (R)

Wyoming 
 . Vincent Carter (R)

Non-voting members 
 . Daniel Sutherland (R)
 . Victor S. K. Houston (R)
 . Pedro Guevara (Nac.)
 . Camilo Osías (Nac.)
 . Félix Córdova Dávila

Changes in membership
The count below reflects changes from the beginning of the first session of this Congress.

Senate 
 Replacements: 15
 Democratic: 3-seat net gain
 Republican: 1-seat net loss
 Deaths: 5
 Resignations: 3
 Interim appointments: 6
 Total seats with changes: 9

|-
| Kansas(3)
| Vacant
| Charles Curtis (R) had resigned at end of previous congress to become Vice President of the United States.Successor appointed April 1, 1929, to continue the term.Successor later lost nomination to finish the term, see below.
| nowrap  | Henry J. Allen (R)
| April 1, 1929

|-
| Pennsylvania(3)
| Vacant
| Sen.-elect William S. Vare (R) was apparently elected but vote was never certified by the Governor due to election irregularities. The Senate refused to qualify him and he was formally unseated December 9, 1929.Successor appointed December 11, 1929.Successor later lost nomination to finish the term, see below.
| nowrap  | Joseph R. Grundy (R)
| December 11, 1929

|-
| Tennessee(2)
| nowrap  | Lawrence Tyson (D)
| Died August 24, 1929.Successor appointed September 2, 1929, to continue the term.Successor was also later elected November 4, 1930, to finish the term.
| nowrap  | William E. Brock (D)
| September 2, 1929

|-
| Ohio(3)
| nowrap  | Theodore E. Burton (R)
| Died October 28, 1929.Successor appointed November 5, 1929, to continue the term.Successor later lost election to finish the term, see below.
| nowrap  | Roscoe C. McCulloch (R)
| November 5, 1929

|-
| New Jersey(2)
| nowrap  | Walter E. Edge (R)
| Resigned November 21, 1929, to become U.S. Ambassador to France.Successor appointed November 30, 1929, to continue the term.Successor later did not run to finish the term, see below.
| nowrap  | David Baird Jr. (R)
| November 30, 1929

|-
| Wyoming(2)
| nowrap  | Francis E. Warren (R)
| Died November 24, 1929.Successor appointed December 5, 1929.Successor later did not run to finish the term, see below.
| nowrap  | Patrick J. Sullivan (R)
| December 5, 1929

|-
| Kentucky(2)
| nowrap  | Frederic M. Sackett (R)
| Resigned January 9, 1930, to become U.S. Ambassador to Germany.Successor appointed January 11, 1930, to continue the term.Successor later lost election to finish the term, see below.
| nowrap  | John M. Robsion (R)
| January 11, 1930

|-
| Wyoming(2)
| nowrap  | Patrick Joseph Sullivan (R)
| Interim appointee did not run to finish the term.Successor elected November 4, 1930.
| nowrap  | Robert D. Carey (R)
| December 1, 1930

|-
| Kansas(3)
| nowrap  | Henry J. Allen (R)
| Interim appointee lost election to finish the term.Successor elected November 4, 1930.
| nowrap  | George McGill (D)
| December 1, 1930

|-
| Kentucky(2)
| nowrap  | John M. Robsion (R)
| Interim appointee lost election to finish the term.Successor elected November 4, 1930.
| nowrap  | Ben M. Williamson (D)
| December 1, 1930

|-
| Ohio(3)
| nowrap  | Roscoe C. McCulloch (R)
| Interim appointee lost election to finish the term.Successor elected November 4, 1930.
| nowrap  | Robert J. Bulkley (D)
| December 1, 1930

|-
| Pennsylvania(3)
| nowrap  | Joseph R. Grundy (R)
| Interim appointee lost nomination to finish the term.Successor elected November 4, 1930.
| nowrap  | James J. Davis (R)
| December 2, 1930

|-
| New Jersey(2)
| nowrap  | David Baird Jr. (R)
| Interim appointee did not run to finish the term.Successor elected November 4, 1930.
| nowrap  | Dwight Morrow (R)
| December 3, 1930

|-
| North Carolina(3)
| nowrap  | Lee S. Overman (D)
| Died December 12, 1930.Successor appointed December 13, 1930, to continue the term.Successor later lost election to finish the term, see (72nd United States Congress).
| nowrap  | Cameron A. Morrison (D)
| December 13, 1930

|-
| Vermont(1)
| nowrap  | Frank L. Greene (R)
| Died December 17, 1930.Successor appointed December 23, 1930, to continue the term.Successor later lost nomination to finish the term, see (72nd United States Congress).
| nowrap  | Frank C. Partridge (R)
| December 23, 1930

|}

House of Representatives 
 Replacements: 27
 Democratic: 4 seat net gain
 Republican: 3 seat net loss
 Deaths: 25
 Resignations: 6
 Contested election: 1
 Total seats with changes: 32

Committees

Senate

 Agriculture and Forestry (Chairman: Charles L. McNary; Ranking Member: Ellison D. Smith)
 Air Mail and Ocean Mail Contracts (Special)
 Alaska Railroad (Special Select)
 Appropriations (Chairman: Francis E. Warren then Wesley L. Jones; Ranking Member: William J. Harris)
 Audit and Control the Contingent Expenses of the Senate (Chairman: Charles S. Deneen; Ranking Member: Thaddeus H. Caraway)
 Banking and Currency (Chairman: Peter Norbeck; Ranking Member: Duncan U. Fletcher)
 Civil Service (Chairman: Porter H. Dale; Ranking Member: Kenneth McKellar)
 Claims (Chairman: Robert B. Howell; Ranking Member: Park Trammell)
 Commerce (Chairman: Hiram W. Johnson; Ranking Member: Duncan U. Fletcher)
 Depreciation of Foreign Currencies (Select)
 District of Columbia (Chairman: Arthur Capper; Ranking Member: William H. King)
 Education and Labor (Chairman: Jesse H. Metcalf; Ranking Member: Royal S. Copeland)
 Enrolled Bills (Chairman: Frank L. Greene; Ranking Member: Coleman L. Blease)
 Expenditures in Executive Departments (Chairman: Frederick M. Sackett then Guy D. Goff; Ranking Member: Claude A. Swanson)
 Finance (Chairman: Reed Smoot; Ranking Member: Furnifold M. Simmons)
 Foreign Relations (Chairman: William E. Borah; Ranking Member: Claude A. Swanson)
 Immigration (Chairman: Arthur R. Gould; Ranking Member: William H. King)
 Indian Affairs (Chairman: Lynn J. Frazier; Ranking Member: Henry F. Ashurst)
 Interoceanic Canals (Chairman: Thomas D. Schall; Ranking Member: Thomas J. Walsh)
 Interstate Commerce (Chairman: James Couzens; Ranking Member: Ellison D. Smith)
 Irrigation and Reclamation (Chairman: John Thomas; Ranking Member: Morris Sheppard)
 Judiciary (Chairman: George W. Norris; Ranking Member: Lee S. Overman then Henry F. Ashurst)
 Library (Chairman: Simeon D. Fess; Ranking Member: Kenneth McKellar)
 Manufactures (Chairman: Robert M. La Follette Jr.; Ranking Member: Ellison D. Smith)
 Military Affairs (Chairman: David A. Reed; Ranking Member: Duncan U. Fletcher)
 Mines and Mining (Chairman: Roscoe C. Patterson; Ranking Member: Thomas J. Walsh)
 Mississippi Flood Control Project (Select)
 Naval Affairs (Chairman: Frederick Hale; Ranking Member: Claude A. Swanson)
 Patents (Chairman: Charles W. Waterman; Ranking Member: Ellison D. Smith)
 Pensions (Chairman: Arthur R. Robinson; Ranking Member: Burton K. Wheeler)
 Post Office Leases (Select) 
 Post Office and Post Roads (Chairman: Lawrence C. Phipps; Ranking Member: Kenneth McKellar)
 Printing (Chairman: George H. Moses; Ranking Member: Duncan U. Fletcher)
 Privileges and Elections (Chairman: Samuel M. Shortridge; Ranking Member: William H. King)
 Public Buildings and Grounds (Chairman: Henry W. Keyes; Ranking Member: Duncan U. Fletcher)
 Public Lands and Surveys (Chairman: Gerald P. Nye; Ranking Member: Key Pittman)
 Reconstruction Finance Corporation (Select)
 Rules (Chairman: George H. Moses; Ranking Member: Lee S. Overman then Pat Harrison)
 Territories and Insular Affairs (Chairman: Hiram Bingham; Ranking Member: Key Pittman) 
 Whole

House of Representatives

 Accounts (Chairman: Charles L. Underhill; Ranking Member: Lindsay C. Warren)
 Agriculture (Chairman: Gilbert N. Haugen; Ranking Member: James B. Aswell)
 Appropriations (Chairman: William R. Wood; Ranking Member: Joseph W. Byrns)
 Banking and Currency (Chairman: Louis T. McFadden; Ranking Member: Otis Wingo then John E. Rankin)
 Census (Chairman: E. Hart Fenn; Ranking Member: John E. Rankin)
 Civil Service (Chairman: Frederick R. Lehlbach; Ranking Member: Lamar Jeffers)
 Claims (Chairman: Edward M. Irwin; Ranking Member: John C. Box)
 Coinage, Weights and Measures (Chairman: Randolph Perkins; Ranking Member: Edgar Howard)
 Disposition of Executive Papers (Chairman: Edward H. Wason; Ranking Member: Robert A. Green)
 District of Columbia (Chairman: Frederick N. Zihlman; Ranking Member: Christopher D. Sullivan)
 Education (Chairman: Daniel A. Reed; Ranking Member: Loring M. Black)
 Election of the President, Vice President and Representatives in Congress (Chairman: Charles L. Gifford; Ranking Member: Lamar Jeffers)
 Elections No.#1 (Chairman: Carroll L. Beedy; Ranking Member: Edward E. Eslick)
 Elections No.#2 (Chairman: Bird J. Vincent; Ranking Member: John J. Douglass)
 Elections No.#3 (Chairman: Willis G. Sears; Ranking Member: John H. Kerr)
 Enrolled Bills (Chairman: Guy E. Campbell; Ranking Member: Mell G. Underwood)
 Expenditures in the Executive Departments (Chairman: William Williamson; Ranking Member: Allard H. Gasque)
 Flood Control (Chairman: Frank R. Reid; Ranking Member: Riley J. Wilson)
 Foreign Affairs (Chairman: Stephen G. Porter; Ranking Member: J. Charles Linthicum)
 Immigration and Naturalization (Chairman: Albert Johnson; Ranking Member: John C. Box)
 Indian Affairs (Chairman: Scott Leavitt; Ranking Member: John M. Evans)
 Insular Affairs (Chairman: Edgar R. Kiess; Ranking Member: Christopher D. Sullivan)
 Interstate and Foreign Commerce (Chairman: James S. Parker; Ranking Member: Sam Rayburn)
 Invalid Pensions (Chairman: John M. Nelson; Ranking Member: Mell G. Underwood)
 Irrigation and Reclamation (Chairman: Addison T. Smith; Ranking Member: C. B. Hudspeth)
 Judiciary (Chairman: George S. Graham; Ranking Member: Hatton W. Sumners) 
 Labor (Chairman: William F. Kopp; Ranking Member: William P. Connery Jr.)
 Library (Chairman: Robert Luce; Ranking Member: Lindsay C. Warren)
 Memorials (Chairman: Burton L. French; Ranking Member: N/A)
 Merchant Marine and Fisheries (Chairman: Wallace H. White Jr.; Ranking Member: Ewin L. Davis)
 Military Affairs (Chairman: W. Frank James; Ranking Member: Percy E. Quin)
 Mines and Mining (Chairman: William H. Sproul; Ranking Member: Arthur H. Greenwood)
 Naval Affairs (Chairman: Frederick A. Britten; Ranking Member: Carl Vinson)
 Patents (Chairman: Albert H. Vestal; Ranking Member: Fritz G. Lanham)
 Pensions (Chairman: Harold Knutson; Ranking Member: Allard H. Gasque)
 Post Office and Post Roads (Chairman: Archie D. Sanders; Ranking Member: Thomas M. Bell)
 Printing (Chairman: Edward M. Beers; Ranking Member: William F. Stevenson)
 Public Buildings and Grounds (Chairman: Richard N. Elliott; Ranking Member: Fritz G. Lanham)
 Public Lands (Chairman: Don B. Colton; Ranking Member: John M. Evans)
 Revision of Laws (Chairman: Roy G. Fitzgerald; Ranking Member: Loring M. Black)
 Rivers and Harbors (Chairman: S. Wallace Dempsey; Ranking Member: Joseph J. Mansfield)
 Roads (Chairman: Cassius C. Dowell; Ranking Member: Edward B. Almon)
 Rules (Chairman: Bertrand H. Snell; Ranking Member: Edward W. Pou)
 Standards of Official Conduct
 Territories (Chairman: Charles F. Curry; Ranking Member: William C. Lankford)
 War Claims (Chairman: James G. Strong; Ranking Member: Miles C. Allgood)
 Ways and Means (Chairman: Willis C. Hawley; Ranking Member: John N. Garner)
 World War Veterans' Legislation (Chairman: Royal C. Johnson; Ranking Member: John E. Rankin)
 Whole

Joint committees

 Conditions of Indian Tribes (Special)
 Disposition of (Useless) Executive Papers
 The Library (Chairman: Sen. Simeon D. Fess)
 Printing (Chairman: Sen. George H. Moses then Duncan U. Fletcher; Vice Chairman: Rep. Edgar R. Kiess)
 Taxation (Chairman: Rep. Willis C. Hawley)
 Veterans' Affairs

Caucuses
 Democratic (House)
 Democratic (Senate)

Officers

Legislative branch agency directors
 Architect of the Capitol: David Lynn
 Attending Physician of the United States Congress: George Calver
 Comptroller General of the United States: John R. McCarl
 Librarian of Congress: Herbert Putnam 
 Public Printer of the United States: George H. Carter

Senate 
 Secretary: Edwin P. Thayer
 Sergeant at Arms: David S. Barry
 Librarian: Edward C. Goodwin
 Chaplain: ZeBarney T. Phillips (Episcopalian)
 Democratic Party Secretary: Edwin A. Halsey, from 1929
 Republican Party Secretary: Carl A. Loeffler, from 1929

House of Representatives 
 Clerk: William T. Page
 Sergeant at Arms: Joseph G. Rodgers
 Doorkeeper: Bert W. Kennedy
 Postmaster: Frank W. Collier
 Parliamentarian: Lewis Deschler
 Reading Clerks: Patrick Joseph Haltigan (D) and Alney E. Chaffee (R)
 Chaplain: James S. Montgomery (Methodist)

See also 
 1928 United States elections (elections leading to this Congress)
 1928 United States presidential election
 1928 United States Senate elections
 1928 United States House of Representatives elections
 1930 United States elections (elections during this Congress, leading to the next Congress)
 1930 United States Senate elections
 1930 United States House of Representatives elections

Notes

References

External links
 Biographical Directory of the U.S. Congress
 U.S. House of Representatives: House History
 U.S. Senate: Statistics and Lists